Ma, MA, or master

Academia
 Master of Arts, a degree award
 Marin Academy, a high school in San Rafael, California
 Minnehaha Academy, a private high school in Minneapolis, Minnesota

Arts and entertainment

Music
 Encyclopaedia Metallum: The Metal Archives, a website devoted to heavy metal bands
 Ma (Anjan Dutt album) (1998)
 Ma (Rare Earth album) (1973)
 Ma (Sagarika album) (1998)
 Ma (Zubeen Garg album) (2019)
 Massive Attack, a British trip hop band
 In music instructions, "but", especially in the phrase ma non troppo (see Glossary of musical terminology#M)
 In tonic sol-fa, a flattened me

Other media
 Ma (film), a 2019 horror film starring Octavia Spencer and Luke Evans
 Ma (negative space), a word of Japanese origin used in art and design
 "Mature audience", a U.S. television rating system category, abbreviated TV-MA
 "MA15+", a classification of the Australian Office of Film and Literature Classification, meaning "Not suitable for ages under 15"
 Memory Alpha, a Star Trek-oriented wiki
 Miss America, a beauty pageant, and the title awarded at said pageant
 MA (journal), a Hungarian art magazine

Fictional characters
 Ma (The Lion King), a main character in the animated film Lion King 1½
 Ma and Pa Kettle, 1940s and 1950s comic film characters

Businesses and organizations
 Malév Hungarian Airlines (IATA designator: MA)
 Mastercard (NYSE stock symbol: MA)
 Motorcycling Australia
 Motorsport Australia
 Orange Movement (Movimento Arancione), an Italian political party
 Market America, a product brokerage and internet marketing company
 Museums Association, UK
 Musicians Australia, a trade union run by the Media, Entertainment and Arts Alliance

Ethnic groups
 Mạ people, a Vietnamese ethnic group
 Meshwesh (Ma), an ancient Libyan (i.e., Berber) tribe from Cyrenaica

Human names and individuals
 Ma (surname), a common Chinese family name
 Maria (Mª or Ma.), according to Spanish naming customs
 Ma Barker (1873–1935), American criminal and mother of criminals
 Ma Rainey, stage name of early American blues singer Gertrude Pridgett (1886–1939)
 Ma Anand Sheela, Osho movement leader convicted of multiple attempted murders

Language
 Má, a Chinese word for cannabis
 Ma (cuneiform), a cuneiform sign
 Ma (Javanese) (ꦩ), a letter in the Javanese script
 Ma (kana), a Japanese kana
 Ma (negative space), a Japanese reading of a Sino-Japanese character
 Ma language, a language spoken in the Democratic Republic of Congo
 Ma language (Papuan), a language of Papua New Guinea

Mythology
 Ma (Sumerian mythology), in Sumerian mythology, that from which the "primeval land" was formed
 Ma (goddess), an Anatolian goddess
 Ma, a mythohistoric entrepreneur for whom the Malaysian town of Marang, Terengganu was purportedly named

Places
 Ma River, a river in Vietnam and Laos
 Ma, Tibet, a village and township in Tibet
 Morocco (ISO 3166-1 country code)
 .ma, the Internet country code top-level domain (ccTLD) for Morocco
 FIPS 10-4 country code of Madagascar
 Maranhão, a state of Brazil, postal code MA
 Maluku, a province of Indonesia (ISO 3166-2:ID subdivisions)
 Massachusetts, a state of the United States

Science, technology, and mathematics

Chemistry
 Methyl anthranilate, used as a bird repellent
 Minor actinides, the actinide elements in used nuclear fuel other than uranium and plutonium
 Monomethyl aniline, a solvent, chemical intermediate, and gasoline additive
 Methylammonium (CH3NH3), e.g., in methylammonium lead halides

Health and medicine
 MA (chemotherapy) is an acronym for Mitoxantrone + standard-dose Ara-C (cytarabine) chemotherapy regimen
 Marijuana Anonymous, a group recovery program aimed at marijuana addiction
 Marketing authorisation, an authorisation granted by a regulatory authority to market a new drug
 Medical assistant, a type of health care worker
 Metabolic acidosis, a medical condition in which the pH of body is decreased beyond the normal range
 Metabolic alkalosis, a medical condition in which the pH of body is elevated beyond the normal range
 Methamphetamine, a psychostimulant

Mathematics
 MA (complexity), a set of decision problems that can be decided by an Arthur–Merlin protocol
 Martin's axiom, an axiom in mathematical logic
 Moving-average model (MA), in statistics

Measurements
 Mach number (Ma), a measure of speed compared to the speed of sound
 Megaampere (MA), a multiple of the SI unit of electric current, the ampere
 Megaannum (Ma), one million years
 Milliampere (mA), a multiple of the SI unit of electric current, the ampere
 Myr, Mya, or Ma, meaning "million years ago"

Other uses in science and technology
 Mechanical advantage (MA), mechanical multiplier of input force
 Mechanical alloying (MA), a technique to produce alloys
 Marketing automation (MA), technology designed to automate marketing-related tasks
 Ma, a type of interface in an IP Multimedia Subsystem

Other uses
 Ma (mom), a synonym for Mother
 Ma clique, a group of warlords from 1919 until 1928
 Martial arts
 Master-at-arms (United States Navy) (MA), an enlisted rating in the US Navy
 Metropolitan area
 Middle Ages, a period of European history
 Motorcycle accident
 Motorsport Australia

See also
 Maa (disambiguation)
 Mother (disambiguation)
 Mommy (disambiguation)
 Mama (disambiguation)
 Mom (disambiguation)
 Mum (disambiguation)